Bilheti is a village in Gwalior district in Madhya Pradesh. Bilheti is located at a distance of 20 km from Gwalior city in east direction on Gwalior-Chitaura Road.

References

Villages in Gwalior district